422 class may refer to:

DBAG Class 422, the German EMU
FS Class 422, the Prussian locomotive
New South Wales 422 class locomotive